Trixiceps is a genus of parasitic flies in the family Tachinidae.

Species
Trixiceps magnipalpis (Bezzi, 1922)
Trixiceps russea Mesnil, 1980

References

Dexiinae
Diptera of Africa
Diptera of Asia
Taxa named by Joseph Villeneuve de Janti
Tachinidae genera